Erin Kamler (born 1975) is an American writer, composer, and academic researcher who works at the intersection of feminist social justice and the arts.

Dr. Erin Kamler is an American writer, composer, musician and academic researcher who works at the intersection of feminist social justice and the arts. Over the past eleven years, Erin has worked as a researcher and gender equality consultant with numerous international development agencies, NGOs and civil society organizations in Burma, Thailand, and throughout Southeast Asia. Source

A native of Ann Arbor, Michigan, Erin earned her Ph.D. from USC's Annenberg School for Communication and Journalism, where her research focused on the trafficking and migration of women in Thailand and Burma, and using the arts as a tool for political communication and human rights witnessing. Conversationally fluent in the Thai language, Erin holds a Masters in Public Diplomacy from USC's School of International Relations, a Masters in Communication Arts from USC's Annenberg School and a Bachelors in music composition from Sarah Lawrence College.

Recent projects as a composer and playwright include Foreign, Andaman, Land of Smiles, Divorce! The Musical, and Runway 69. Her work has been staged at New Dramatists, Berkeley Rep, The Public Theater, Playwright's Horizons, Edinburgh Fringe Festival, and she is a three-time winner of Stephen Sondheim's Young Playwright's Festival and University of Michigan's Hopwood Award. She is a member of the Dramatists Guild.

Erin divides her time between Thailand and the United States, where she serves as an Affiliated Researcher at Chiang Mai University and Academic Program Director at Minerva Project and Visiting Professor of Arts and Humanities at Minerva University.
She is currently working on a series of musicals, THE MONSOON TRILOGY, about human rights issues in Southeast Asia. Source

Recording and performance 
As a recording artist, Erin has performed in India, Japan, Mexico, Italy, Turkey, Thailand and throughout the United States with her albums: The Street Is Not A Woman (1998), Mantra Girl: Truth (2002), Mantra Girl: Trinity (2005) and Kundalini Yoga Instructional DVD's (2003). Her music can be heard on numerous albums and films.

Academic projects 
 Kamler. Erin M. (2019). Rewriting the Victim: Dramatization as Research in Thailand’s Anti-trafficking Movement. New York: Oxford University Press.
 Kamler, Erin M. (2016). Performing Land of Smiles: Dramatization as research in Thailand's antitrafficking movement. International Journal of Communication 10 (2016), 3666–3688.
 Kamler, Erin M. (2015). Women of the Kachin conflict: Trafficking and militarized femininity on the Burma-China border. Journal of Human Trafficking, 1:3, 209-234, DOI: 10.1080/23322705.2015.1014664.
 Kamler, Erin. (2014). "Trafficking and Coerced Prostitution in Thailand: Re-Conceptualizing International Law in the Age of Globalization." In Liamputtong, P. (ed.) Contemporary socio-cultural and political perspectives in Thailand. Springer: Dordrecht, The Netherlands.
 Kamler, Erin Michelle. (2013). Toward a methodology of arts-based participatory action research: Evaluating a theatre of the oppressed classroom site. New Scholar: An International Journal of the Humanities, Creative Arts and Social Sciences. 2 (1), 107-120. 
 Kamler, Erin Michelle. (2012). Rhacel Salazar Parreñas, Illicit Flirtations: Labor, Migration and Sex Trafficking in Tokyo. International Journal of Communication 6.
 Negotiating narratives of human trafficking: NGOs, communication and the power of culture. (2012) Journal of Intercultural Communication Research. 1–18. London: Routledge.
 Kamler, Erin. (2012). "Anti-Trafficking Responses to Thailand's Tier 2 Watch List Status: Seeing Policy Through Women's Eyes" This report examines the effects of anti-trafficking policies on female migrant laborers in Thailand, and offers recommendations for building a prevention-oriented approach to trafficking.
 NGO narratives in the global public sphere. (2011). The International Journal of Diversity in Organizations, Communities and Nations. Illinois: Common Ground.
 Wendy S. Hesford, Spectacular Rhetorics: Human Rights Visions, Recognitions, Feminisms. (2011). International Journal of Communication 5.
 Thai nationalism and the crisis of the colonised self. (2010). The South and Southeast Asia Culture and Religion Journal.Vol. IV. pp. 98-112.
 National identity, the shan, and child trafficking in northern Thailand: The case of D.E.P.D.C. (2010). Shan and Beyond: essays on Shan Archaeology, Anthropology, History, Politics, Religion, and Human Rights. Bangkok: Institute of Asian Studies, Chulalongkorn University.

Musicals

Land of Smiles 

Book, Music and Lyrics by Erin Kamler 

Land of Smiles is a fictional, full -length musical about the trafficking of women in Thailand, as seen through the eyes of sex workers, grassroots activists, NGO employees and other members of the anti-trafficking movement. Based on field research including over 50 interviews, Land of Smiles presents a dramatic look at how the story about trafficking is told, and shows that finding a solution to this problem is even more complicated than it seems.

The story focuses on the aftermath of a brothel raid in Chiang Rai, Northern Thailand. Lipoh, a young Kachin (ethnic minority) migrant from Burma, seems to be underage, making her an automatic "trafficking victim" in the eyes of the law. Emma Gable, an NGO case worker from Cedar Falls, Indiana is sent to prepare Lipoh to be a witness in a trial to prosecute her trafficker. Emma must convince Lipoh to be the person everyone sees: a trafficking victim. But Lipoh is unwilling to cooperate. She insists that she is eighteen, and was working in the brothel willingly. Not only that—she wants to go back.

What transpires is a journey into Thailand's anti-trafficking movement—a world burdened with politics, morality and the rhetoric of human rights. Through hearing Lipoh's story, Emma discovers that grave atrocities are being committed against the Kachin people of Burma. But these atrocities are overshadowed by a narrative about trafficking that serves the needs of the anti-trafficking movement, rather than the women it is trying to help. In 2013, Land of Smiles was workshopped at the Gate Theater in Chiang Mai, Thailand, and garnered critical acclaim at the Edinburgh Fringe Festival in Scotland in 2014.

"To tackle these themes in a piece of theatre would be bold. To do so in a musical, balancing some challenging questions with a moving personal story and some beautiful songs, is nothing short of remarkable." Susan Mansfield, The Scotsman 

"Land of Smiles is a beautifully composed and highly creative rebuttal to the widely held assumptions that underpin anti-trafficking policies that have proven to be at best counterproductive and at worst extremely harmful to the very people they are meant to help." Seamus Martov, The Irrawaddy 

"Erin Kamler once again shows her versatility and creativity with skillful lyric writing and a passionate story." Kate West, Kate West Reviews

Divorce: The Musical

Book, Music and Lyrics by Erin Kamler

Drawing from personal experiences and sharp observations about the state of marriage and divorce in America today, Kamler and her team created a show that exposed divorce for what it really is: a social and legal process that treats human beings like cogs in a wheel. Combining comedy with theatrical songwriting, the show features greedy lawyers who instigate conflict in order to drag cases out and rake in the money, state laws that force vulnerable couples to publicly turn against each other during what should be a private time, therapists who are too consumed with their own problems to make a positive impact in their patient's lives, and parents who get too emotional and take their children's relationships personally.

The show depicts the tragic combination of love and expectation, the danger of miscommunication and disrespect, and the delicacy of a bond that often gets taken for granted. As Divorce! The Musical, the show made its 2009 world premiere at the Hudson Theater in Los Angeles where it garnered the Los Angeles Times Critic's Choice, Backstage West's Critic's Pick, won the 2009 Los Angeles Ovation Award for Best Book, Music and Lyrics for an Original Musical, won the 2010 Backstage Garland Award for Best Playwriting, the 2010 Backstage Garland Award for Best Musical Score, the 2009 LA Weekly Awards for Best Director and Musical Director, and was nominated for the 2010 LA Drama Critics Circle Award for Best Original Score. The show was featured on NPR's All Things Considered and Entertainment Tonight.

"Hilarious and tuneful... rare to find a comedic musical in which the trenchancy of the social commentary is as engaging as the songs," Les Spindle, Frontiers L.A. Magazine

"Erin Kamler's witty and entertaining new musical satire takes apart almost every emotional phase of a marital breakup, including the horrors of dating and the hollows of rebound sex, and sets it to chirpy and wry songs that feature some sophisticated musical juxtapositions and harmonies." Steven Leigh Morris, LA Weekly

"Erin Kamler... skillfully negotiates her slippery subject and scores a theatrical hat-trick", F. Kathleen Foley, L.A. Times

"Erin Kamler's lyrics are universally real, hitting home… A remarkably fun show," Kate West, RAVE Los Angeles Times Reader Review

"Kamler's lyrics are funny as all get-out and perceptive as well... The show is first-rate all the way, " Steven Stanley, Stage Scene LA

"Every divorce should be this fun," Ophelia Chong, KCET

"A rollicking crowd-pleaser!" The Tolucan Times

Runway 69

Winner of the 2008 Frederick Loewe Award, presented by New Dramatists. A new musical by Erin Kamler and Carson Kreitzer about that infamous strip club, set on the eve of the Times Square clean-up.

Awards 
Los Angeles Ovation Award (2009), Backstage Garland Awards (2010),
Frederick Loewe Award (2008),
Stephen Sondheim's Young Playwright's Award (1991, 1992, 1994),
University of Michigan Hopwood Award (1994).

Notes

References 
 Erin Kamler's website

American women composers
21st-century American composers
Living people
1975 births
Sarah Lawrence College alumni
USC Annenberg School for Communication and Journalism alumni
University of Michigan alumni
USC School of International Relations alumni
21st-century American women musicians
Musicians from Ann Arbor, Michigan
21st-century women composers